The following is the filmography of American film and stage actor, film producer and author Kirk Douglas (1916–2020). His popular films include Out of the Past (1947), Champion (1949), Ace in the Hole (1951), The Bad and the Beautiful (1952), 20,000 Leagues Under the Sea (1954), Lust for Life (1956), Paths of Glory (1957), Gunfight at the O.K. Corral (1957),  The Vikings (1958), Spartacus (1960), Lonely Are the Brave (1962), Seven Days in May (1964), The Heroes of Telemark (1965), Saturn 3 (1980) and Tough Guys (1986).

He is No. 17 on the American Film Institute's list of the greatest male screen legends in American film history. In 1996, he received the Academy Honorary Award "for 50 years as a creative and moral force in the motion picture community".

Filmography

As actor

As producer

References

External links

Douglas, Kirk
Douglas, Kirk